S. carnea may refer to:

 Salvia carnea, a flowering plant
 Sarcina carnea, a cocci bacteria
 Savia carnea, a flowering plant
 Scilla carnea, a herbaceous perennial
 Sparganophilus carnea, a mud-dwelling earthworm